Atziluth or Atzilut (also Olam Atsiluth, עוֹלָם אֲצִילוּת, literally "the World of Emanation") is the highest of four worlds in which exists the Kabbalistic Tree of Life. It is also known as "near to God." Beri'ah follows it. It is known as the World of Emanations, or the World of Causes. In the  Kabbalah, each of the Sephiroth in this world is associated with a Name of God, and it is associated with the Suit of Wands in the Tarot.

Significance

Atziluth is the realm of pure divinity. The four worlds of Kabbalah relate to the Tree of Life in two primary ways: 
 Firstly, it is taught that the whole tree is contained in each of the four worlds, and in this manner they are described one on top of another, and in symbolic form, by a diagram called Jacob's Ladder. 
 Secondly, is taught that the Tree of Life can be subdivided into four horizontal sections, each representing one of the four worlds. 

It should be remembered that in Kabbalah each of the ten Sephirot of the Tree of Life also contains a whole tree inside itself. The realm of Atziluth is thus related to the top three Sephirot of the Tree of Life; these three spheres of Kether, Chokmah and Binah are considered to be wholly spiritual in nature and are separated from the rest of the tree by a region of reality called the Abyss.

Origins
The theory of emanation, which is conceived as a free act of the will of God, endeavors to surmount the difficulties that attach to the idea of creation in its relation to God. These difficulties are threefold: 
 the act of creation involves a change in the unchangeable being of God; 
 it is incomprehensible how the absolutely infinite and perfect being could have produced such imperfect and finite beings; 
 a creatio ex nihilo is difficult to imagine. 
The simile used for the emanation is either the soaked sponge that emits spontaneously the water it has absorbed, or the gushing spring that overflows, or the sunlight that sends forth its rays—parts of its own essence—everywhere, without losing any portion, however infinitesimal, of its being. Since it was the last-named simile that chiefly occupied and influenced the Kabbalistic writers, Atziluth must properly be taken to mean "eradiation" (compare Zohar, Exodus Yitro, 86b).

Later on the expression "Atziluth" assumed a more specific meaning, influenced no doubt by the little work, Maseket Atzilut. Herein for the first time (following : "I have created"; "I have formed"; "I have made"), the four worlds are distinguished: Atziluth, Beri'ah, Yetzirah, and Assiah. But here too they are transferred to the region of spirits and angels: 
 In the Atzilah-world the Shekinah alone rules; 
 in the Beri'ah-world are the throne of God and the souls of the just under the dominion of Akatriel ("Crown of God"); 
 in the Yetzirah-world are the "holy creatures" (ḥayyot) of Ezekiel's vision, and the ten classes of angels ruled over by Metatron; 
 and in the Assiah-world are the Ofanim, and the angels that combat evil, governed by Sandalphon. 
In the Zohar, Atziluth is taken to be simply the direct emanation of God, in contradistinction to the other emanations derived from the Sephirot. No fourfold world is mentioned.

Moses Cordovero and Isaac Luria (sixteenth century) were the first to introduce the fourfold world as an essential principle into Kabbalistic speculation. According to this doctrine,
 the Atzilah-world represents the ten Sephirot; 
 the Beriah-world (world of creation) the throne of God, emanating from the light of the Sephirot; 
 the Yezirah-world (world of becoming) the ten classes of angels, forming the halls for the Sephirot; 
 and the Assiah-world (world of making, that is, of form) the different heavens and the material world. 
In contradistinction to the Atzilah-world, which constitutes the domain of the Sephirot, the three other worlds are called by the general name "Pirud".

Correspondences
 The letter yud י in the Tetragrammaton
 The sefirah of Chochmah and hence the partzuf of Abba
 The element of Fire
 The soul-level of Chayah
 The brain (Patach Eliyahu)
 The Shemoneh Esrei in the Shacharit prayer service
 In the allegory of the teacher and the student, the first stage where the teacher has a flash of inspiration, or an unexpanded concept that he wishes to give to the student
 The fixed, fire, sign of Leo (astrology).

References

 

Four Worlds
Kabbalistic words and phrases